Drag You Down may refer to:

 "Drag You Down", a song by Finger Eleven from The Greyest of Blue Skies (2000)
 "Drag You Down", a song by Ivy, the B-side of the single "Get Enough"  (1994)
 "Drag You Down", a song by Orphanage from Inside (2000)
 "Drag You Down", a song by The Pierces fromYou & I (2011)
 "Drag You Down", a song by Rattlesnake Remedy (2006)
 "Drag You Down", a fictitious entry song created by the music writer Joel Whitburn as a copyright trap